Hans Schweikart (1 October 1895 – 1 December 1975) was a German film director, actor and screenwriter. He directed 28 films between 1938 and 1968. He wrote for the film The Marriage of Mr. Mississippi, which was entered into the 11th Berlin International Film Festival.

Selected filmography

 Out of the Depths (1919)
 The House on the Moon (1921)
 The Infernal Power (1922)
 The Doll Maker of Kiang-Ning (1923)
 Two Children (1924)
 Hunting You (1929)
 Liberated Hands (1939)
 The Girl from Barnhelm (1940)
 The Girl from Fano (1941)
 The Comedians (1941 - produced)
 The Endless Road (1943)
 I Need You (1944)
 Insolent and in Love (1948)
  Night of the Twelve (1949)
 Beloved Liar (1950)
 Melody of Fate (1950)
 That Can Happen to Anyone (1952)
  Must We Get Divorced? (1953)
 A House Full of Love (1954)
 The Blue Danube (1955)
 Stage Fright (1960)
 Agatha, Stop That Murdering! (1960)
 The Marriage of Mr. Mississippi (1961 - writer)

References

External links

1895 births
1975 deaths
Film people from Berlin
German male film actors
German male silent film actors
Male actors from Berlin
Commanders Crosses of the Order of Merit of the Federal Republic of Germany
20th-century German male actors
German male writers